Algebris (UK) Limited is an asset management company which has historically specialized in the global financial sector. In October 2021 Algebris manages over $18bn in assets under management. Serra, founder and CEO, owns outright the firm.

Algebris (UK) Limited is authorised and regulated by the Financial Conduct Authority and operates in Italy through its Milan branch.
Algebris Investments (US) Inc is a SEC registered Investment Adviser. Algebris Investments (Asia) Pte. Ltd is a Licensed Fund Management Company with the MAS. Algebris Investments K.K.is licensed by Financial Services Agency. Algebris Investments S.à.r.l. is authorised and supervised by the CSSF.

It has offices in London, Milan, Rome, Luxembourg, Dublin, Boston, Singapore, and Tokyo.

History 
Algebris was founded in 2006 by Davide Serra (from Genoa), a former analyst with Morgan Stanley and Eric Halet. 
The first fund, Algebris Global Financials Fund, was launched in October 2006. During the first year the fund grew from $700m to around $2bn managed

Activities 
Historically, Algebris has focused on bank shares and, shortly after 2008, started to seek value primarily in the tier-1 and 2 debt structures of global systemically important financial institutions. Algebris has posted a 9 per cent compound annual return net of fees since 2006 on the $600m it has invested on the equity side.

In November 2012 Financial Times highlighted Algebris Financial CoCo Fund as one of the most profitable in London.

On the financial credit side, which in November 2017 counts for $7.4bn of the firm’s assets under management, including bad loans at face value, the firm has earned 15 per cent annual net returns since it switched its emphasis to financial credit after the 2008 crisis. Alongside subordinated debt and financial equity, the fund has extended into non-performing loans in 2014, a global macro strategy in 2016 investing also outside of financials. In 2017 Algebris launched a fund focused on credit and equity securities of mostly midsized Italian companies.
In February 2021, Algebris announced the launch of a team, led by Valerio Camerano, dedicated to investable solutions in the green transition.

Sustainable development goals 
Algebris became a UNPRI signatory on 23 July 2019.
In 2019 Algebris put into action a carbon off-setting project, aimed at achieving carbon neutrality across the Group by planting 25,000 trees and committing to 20 trees per employee annually. This is being carried out in Tanzania, in collaboration with Hakuna Matata, a registered UK charity founded by Serra.
As of December 2021, Algebris has planted more than 82.000 trees.

References

Financial services companies based in London
Financial services companies established in 2006